Franco Del Campo (born 18 March 1949) is an Italian journalist, writer, professor and retired backstroke swimmer and coach. He competed at the 1968 Summer Olympics in the 100 m and 200 m backstroke and 4 × 100 m medley relay and reached the finals of the first two events.

After retiring from competitions, in the 1970s Del Campo worked as a swimming coach, and since 1978 as a freelance journalist with national newspapers. He later taught political communications at the University of Trieste and is currently professor of philosophy at Liceo Petrarca in Trieste.

References

External links

 
 
 

1949 births
Living people
Italian male backstroke swimmers
Olympic swimmers of Italy
Swimmers at the 1968 Summer Olympics
Mediterranean Games gold medalists for Italy
Mediterranean Games medalists in swimming
Swimmers at the 1967 Mediterranean Games
20th-century Italian people